Mandingo is a 1975 American historical melodrama film that focuses on the Atlantic slave trade in the Antebellum South. The film's title refers to the mandinka people, who are referred to as "Mandingos", and described as being good slaves for fighting matches. Produced by Dino De Laurentiis for Paramount Pictures, the film was directed by Richard Fleischer. The screenplay, by Norman Wexler, was adapted from the 1957 novel Mandingo by Kyle Onstott, and the 1961 play Mandingo by Jack Kirkland (which is derived from the novel).

The film stars Perry King as Hammond, the son of cruel slave owner Warren Maxwell (James Mason). Hammond is known to rape the female slaves on his father's plantation, and his father orders him to marry a white woman to produce grandchildren with no black ancestry. Hammond marries Blanche (Susan George), his cousin, who becomes jealous that he pays more attention to his black lover Ellen (Brenda Sykes) than to his wife, leading Blanche to seduce the Mandingo" fighting slave Mede (Ken Norton).

Mandingo received negative reviews upon release. However, retrospectively, the film's reception became much more favorable. It has been variously seen as a big-budget exploitation film made by a major studio, a serious film about American slavery, examining historical horrors committed against African Americans, or as a work of camp. It was a box office hit and was followed by a sequel, Drum (1976), which starred Norton as a different character and Warren Oates as Hammond.

Plot 
In the Deep South of the United States prior to the American Civil War, Falconhurst is a run-down plantation owned by widower Warren Maxwell and largely run by his son, Hammond.  Hammond and his cousin, Charles, visit a plantation where both men are given black women out of hospitality. Hammond chooses Ellen, who is a virgin. Both she and Hammond watch as Charles abuses and rapes the other woman, with Charles claiming that she likes it. Hammond asks Ellen if this is true, and she says no. Hammond then sleeps with Ellen.

Warren Maxwell pressures him to marry, so Hammond chooses his cousin, Blanche, who is desperate to get out of her house to escape her brother Charles. It is implied that she had an incestuous relationship with Charles. After their wedding night, Hammond is sure that she is not a virgin—a claim Blanche denies. On their way back from their honeymoon, Hammond returns to the plantation where Ellen is kept and purchases her as his sex slave. Eventually, he comes to genuinely care for her.

Meanwhile, Hammond purchases a Mandingo slave named Ganymede.  Nicknamed "Mede", the slave works for Hammond as a prize-fighter.  He's forced to soak in a large cauldron of very hot salt water to ostensibly toughen his skin. Hammond also breeds Mede with Pearl, even though Pearl is a blood relation of Mede's. Hammond makes a great deal of money betting on Mede's fights.

Rejected by Hammond, Blanche becomes a slovenly alcoholic who does nothing all day long.  While Hammond is on a business trip alone, Blanche discovers Ellen is pregnant. Correctly assuming the baby is Hammond's, Blanche beats Ellen. Ellen flees, but falls down some stairs, and miscarries. Hammond (who had promised Ellen that her baby would be freed), returns to Falconhurst and discovers Ellen lost the baby. Threatened with bodily harm by Warren, Ellen does not tell him how she miscarried.  Hammond gives Ellen a pair of ruby earrings, which she wears while serving an evening meal. Hammond gave the matching necklace to Blanche, who becomes enraged to find Ellen being publicly favored by Hammond.

Hammond leaves on another business trip, taking Ellen with him.  A drunken Blanche demands that Mede come to her bedroom.  Although the other slaves attempt to stop him, Mede does as he is ordered. Blanche says she will accuse Mede of rape if he does not have sex with her, so he spends the night with her, on several occasions.

Hammond returns to the plantation.  A great deal of time has passed since Hammond and Blanche's marriage, and Warren Maxwell is eager for a grandchild.  Sensing that the marriage is troubled, Warren locks Hammond and Blanche in a room together and refuses to let them out until they reconcile.  They appear to do so.  A short time later, Blanche announces she is pregnant, but when the baby is born, it is clear the child is mixed race.  To avoid a scandal, the child, on doctor's orders, is allowed to bleed to death from its umbilical cord.  Sickened at Blanche's sexual indiscretion, Hammond asks the doctor if he has the poison he uses on old slaves and horses. He pours the poison into a toddy for Blanche. An outraged Hammond seeks out Mede, intending to kill him.  As Hammond attempts to force Mede into a boiling cauldron of water, Mede tries to tell him that Blanche blackmailed him into having sex with her.  Hammond shoots Mede twice with a rifle and the second shot throws Mede into the boiling water. Hammond uses a pitchfork to drown Mede. In a fit of fury, the slave Agamemnon picks up the rifle and aims it at Hammond. When Warren calls him a "crazy nigger" and demands that he put the gun down, the slave shoots and kills Warren. As he runs away, Hammond kneels helpless next to Warren's lifeless body.

Cast

 James Mason as Warren Maxwell
 Susan George as Blanche Maxwell
 Perry King as Hammond Maxwell
 Richard Ward as Agamemnon
 Brenda Sykes as Ellen
 Ken Norton as Mede
 Sylvester Stallone as Lynching Witness (uncredited)

Production

The original novel sold over 4.5 million copies. Film rights were eventually bought by Dino de Laurentiis.

Producer Ralphe Serpe said during filming that the movie was:

A human, sociological story that's going to bring about a better understanding between the races ... We're faithful to the story of the book but not the spirit. I mean, the book's hackwork, isn't it? It's almost repulsive. A lot of people have read it, but they read it for the wrong reasons. It's really a story of love. We had the script rewritten three times. ... I hated that ending in the book where the guy boils the slave down and pours the soup over his wife's grave. I mean, we have the slave boiled but we cut out the part where he pours the soup on his grave. He just ... pulls away. And we know that tomorrow there's going to be a lot of trouble. It's really a very beautiful ending.

Charlton Heston turned down the role of the father and the role of his son was rejected by Timothy Bottoms, Jan Michael Vincent, Jeff Bridges and Beau Bridges. Boxer Ken Norton turned down a $250,000 gate to fight Jerry Quarry to make the film.

Reception

Contemporary reviews 
The critical reception of Mandingo was predominantly negative upon release, with the film being seen as being campy by reviewers in 1975. On review aggregator website Rotten Tomatoes, the film only holds a 26% critical approval rating. Roger Ebert of the Chicago Sun-Times criticized the film, calling it "racist trash, obscene in its manipulation of human beings and feelings, and excruciating to sit through in an audience made up largely of children, as I did last Saturday afternoon", giving it a "zero star" rating. Richard Schickel of Time magazine found the film boring and cliché-ridden.  Leonard Maltin ranked the film as a "BOMB" and dismissed with the word "Stinko!"

Critical re-evaluation
In the years following the film's initial release, the reception of the film became more favorable. The Chicago Reader writer Jonathan Rosenbaum wrote in 1985 that Mandingo is "One of the most neglected and underrated Hollywood films of its era [...] it’s doubtful whether many more insightful and penetrating movies about American slavery exist." Movie critic Robin Wood was enthusiastic about the film, calling it "the greatest film about race ever made in Hollywood." The New York Times columnist Dave Kehr called it "a thinly veiled Holocaust film that spares none of its protagonists", further describing it as "Fleischer's last great crime film, in which the role of the faceless killer is played by an entire social system." The film has also been the subject of scholarly praise for its handling of race.

In 1996, director Quentin Tarantino has cited Mandingo and Showgirls as the only two instances "in the last twenty years [that] a major studio made a full-on, gigantic, big-budget exploitation movie". In Tarantino's film Django Unchained (2012), the terminology of "Mandingo fighting" was inspired by the 1975 film.

Sequel

Drum, the sequel to Mandingo, was released the following year. Released by United Artists, it was once again produced by Dino De Laurentiis. Ken Norton, Brenda Sykes, and Lillian Hayman were the only actors from the first film to return for the sequel. Norton and Sykes played different characters, and Hayman returned in the role of Lucretia Borgia. Warren Oates took over for Perry King in the role of Hammond Maxwell. The story is set 15 years after the events of the first film.

See also
 List of films featuring slavery

References

Further reading

External links

Josh Olson on Mandingo trailer at Trailers From Hell

1975 films
Blaxploitation films
American boxing films
1970s English-language films
Films about American slavery
Films based on American novels
American films based on plays
Films directed by Richard Fleischer
Films set on farms
Films set in the 1840s
Films shot in New Orleans
Films about interracial romance
Paramount Pictures films
Films based on adaptations
Films produced by Dino De Laurentiis
Films scored by Maurice Jarre
Incest in film
Films with screenplays by Norman Wexler
1970s historical drama films
American historical drama films
1970s American films
Antebellum South
Melodrama films